Sinomicrurus swinhoei is a highly venomous species of coral snake in the family Elapidae. It is endemic to Taiwan. The specific name, swinhoei, is in honor of the English naturalist Robert Swinhoe, who was first European consul in Taiwan. Common name Swinhoe's temperate Asian coralsnake has been proposed for it.

Taxonomy
Originally described as Calliophis swinhoei by John Van Denburgh in 1922, recent literature has treated it as subspecies of Sinomicrurus macclellandi. However, it was elevated back to full species status as Sinomicrurus swinhoei in a 2021 revision of Sinomicrurus by Smart and colleagues.

Description
S. swinhoei are relatively small snakes: males measure  and females  in snout–vent length (SVL). The tail is 10–16 % of SVL. Some sources suggests a much higher maximum total length (i.e., including tail), . There are 13 dorsal scale rows, 223–239 ventral scales in females and 207–221 in males, and 32–36 subcaudal scales in females and 36–41 in males. There are 1+1 temporal scales. The head is dorsally marked with broad cream to white band running across head behind eyes. The base color is brown-black to black. Ventrally, the head is white to very light gray. The snout is whitish. The body and tail are dorsally red to rusty brown, with scales flecked with diffuse dark brown or black. There are a series of narrow, black, light-edged cross bands, which can be incomplete on the flanks. Ventral coloration is cream to light gray with black irregular designs.

Venom
Sinomicrurus swinhoei is highly venomous. Although it is not aggressive and very few reports of attacks have been reported, its venom is potentially life-threatening.

Reproduction
Sinomicrurus swinhoei is oviparous and lays 4–14 eggs in summer.

Habitat and conservation
It lives on montane forest floor, in stone cracks, and among leaf litter. It is cathemeral.

Sinomicrurus sauteri is a rare species that enjoys protected status in Taiwan.

References

swinhoei
Snakes of Asia
Reptiles of Taiwan
Endemic fauna of Taiwan
Taxa named by John Van Denburgh
Reptiles described in 1922